Beta Apodis (β Aps, β Apodis) is the Bayer designation for a star in the southern circumpolar constellation of Apus. The apparent visual magnitude of this star is +4.24, which is bright enough to be seen with the naked eye

The spectrum of this star matches the characteristics of a K0 III, which, according to models of stellar evolution, indicates that it is in the giant star stage, having exhausted the supply of hydrogen at its core. At the estimated distance of this star, this yields a physical size of about 11 times the radius of the Sun. The expanded outer atmosphere of Beta Apodis has an effective temperature of about 4,900 K. This heat is causing it to glow with the characteristic orange hue of a K-type star.

Naming

References

External links
 Image Beta Apodis

149324
Apodis, Beta
Apus (constellation)
K-type giants
081852
6163
Durchmusterung objects